Amin al-Hafiz (12 November 1921 – 17 December 2009), also known as Amin Hafez was a Syrian politician, general, and member of the Ba'ath Party who served as the President of Syria from 27 July 1963 to 23 February 1966.

Career

Early life
Al-Hafiz was born in the city of Aleppo.

Rise to power

The 1963 Syrian coup d'état, led by the Military Committee, introduced al-Hafiz to public life. In the aftermath of the coup, the National Council of the Revolutionary Command (NCRC) became the country's supreme organ. The NCRC was dominated by the Syrian branch of the radical, pan-Arab Ba'ath Party. Al-Hafiz became President,  instituted socialist reforms, and oriented his country towards the Eastern Bloc.

Downfall
On 23 February 1966, al-Hafiz was overthrown by a radical Ba'athist faction headed by Chief of Staff Salah Jadid. A late warning telegram of the coup d'état was sent from Egyptian President Gamal Abdel Nasser to Nasim al-Safarjalani (The General Secretary of Presidential Council), on the early morning of the coup d'état. The coup sprung out of factional rivalry between Jadid's "regionalist" camp of the Ba'ath Party, which promoted ambitions for a Greater Syria, and the more traditionally pan-Arab al-Hafiz faction, called the "nationalist" (qawmi) faction. Jadid's supporters were also seen as more radically left-wing. The coup was also supported and led by officers from Syria's religious minorities, especially the Alawites and the Druze, whereas al-Hafiz belonged to the majority Sunni population.

Exile and return
After being wounded in the three-hour shootout that preceded the coup, in which two of his children were seriously injured, al-Hafiz was jailed in Damascus's Mezzeh prison before being sent to Lebanon in June 1967. A year later, he was relocated to Baghdad. In 1971, the courts of Damascus sentenced him to death in absentia; however, Saddam Hussein "treated him and his fellow exile, Ba'ath founder Michel Aflaq, like royalty", and the sentence was not carried out. After the fall of Saddam in the Iraq War of 2003, al-Hafiz was quietly allowed to return to Syria. He died in Aleppo on 17 December 2009; reports of his age differ, but he was believed to be in his late 80s. He received a state-sponsored funeral.

Popular culture
Amin al-Hafiz was portrayed by Waleed Zuaiter in the Netflix series The Spy.

References

1921 births
2009 deaths
Leaders ousted by a coup
Members of the National Command of the Ba'ath Party
Members of the Regional Command of the Arab Socialist Ba'ath Party – Syria Region
People from Aleppo
Presidents of Syria
Prime Ministers of Syria
Syrian Arab nationalists
Syrian anti-communists
Syrian ministers of interior
Syrian Sunni Muslims
Syrian expatriates in Iraq